The Battle of El Agheila was a brief engagement of the Western Desert Campaign of the Second World War. It took place in December 1942 between Allied forces of the Eighth Army (General Bernard Montgomery) and the Axis forces of the German-Italian Panzer Army ( Erwin Rommel), during the long Axis withdrawal from El Alamein to Tunis. It ended with the German-Italian Panzer Army resuming its retreat towards Tunisia, where the Tunisia Campaign had begun with Operation Torch

Background

On 4 November 1942, Rommel decided to end the Second Battle of El Alamein and withdraw west towards Libya. In doing so, he defied the "Stand to the last" orders of Adolf Hitler, to save the remainder of his force. The  reached the village of Fuka the next day. The Italians resumed their withdrawal on the same day, after an Allied attack and the Germans followed suit. Montgomery rested some of his formations after their efforts at El Alamein, leading with the 4th Light Armoured Brigade.

Rommel received a warning from Hitler of an expected Allied landing between Tobruk and Benghazi but on 8 November, he discovered that this was wrong. There were Anglo-American landings in Morocco and Algeria (Operation Torch). The Eastern Task Force—aimed at Algiers—landed with 20,000 troops and began moving east towards Rommel. Facing the prospect of a large Allied force to his rear, he decided to withdraw in one bound to El Agheila.

Axis forces retired from Sidi Barrani on 9 November and Halfaya Pass (on the Libyan–Egyptian border) the last position in Egypt, on 11 November. Cyrenaica was abandoned without serious resistance. Rommel wanted to save  of equipment in Tobruk but it fell to the British on 13 November. An attempt by Montgomery to trap the Tobruk garrison by an encirclement toward Acroma, west of Tobruk, failed and the garrison retreated along the  toward Benghazi with few losses. Derna and the airfield at Martuba were captured on 15 November and the RAF quickly occupied the airfield to provide air cover for a Malta convoy on 18 November.

Axis forces had withdrawn  in ten days. Despite the importance of the Port of Benghazi to the Axis supply system, Rommel abandoned the port to avoid a repeat of the disastrous entrapment suffered by the Italians at the Battle of Beda Fomm in February 1941. Rommel ordered the demolition of port facilities and supplies in Benghazi, writing afterwards that

Benghazi was occupied by the British on 20 November and three days later, the Axis forces retreated from Agedabia and fell back to Mersa Brega. During their withdrawal to Mersa Brega, Axis forces faced many difficulties, including British air superiority. The Desert Air Force (DAF) attacked Axis columns crowded on the coast road and short of fuel. To delay the British advance, Axis sappers laid mines in the Mersa Brega area; steel helmets were buried to mislead the British "Polish mine detectors".

For much of the pursuit to El Agheila, the British were uncertain of Rommel's intentions. They had been caught out in earlier campaigns by an opponent that had drawn them in and then counter-attacked. Montgomery had intended to build the morale of the Eighth Army by banishing the habit of defeat and retreat and the 1st Armoured Division and 2nd New Zealand Division were held at Bardia, resting and providing a defence. Despite Rommel's concerns of entrapment by a rapid Allied advance across the Cyrenaica bulge, Montgomery was aware that an extended and isolated force could also be vulnerable, as in early 1941 and early 1942. When a reconnaissance force of armoured cars was sent across country, it was delayed by waterlogged ground. Having heard of the presence of the reconnaissance force, Rommel brought forward his retirement from Benghazi and was able to brush the armoured cars aside, untroubled by the stronger force which had yet to arrive.

Prelude

Axis
Rommel wanted to withdraw to Tunis as soon as possible and the others wanted him to make a stand on the El Agheila–Mersa Brega line. Mussolini ordered Rommel to stand on the Agheila line to defend Tripolitania and this was supported by Hitler, who ordered that El Agheila should be held "in all circumstances".

By this time, all available men and equipment were being diverted to Tunis, following the Allied landings of Operation Torch, to prevent Tunisia falling to an Allied advance from Algeria.

British
The British had to supply their forces from Egypt to Agedabia. On 26 November, X Corps (Lieutenant-General Brian Horrocks) was taken into reserve and XXX Corps (Lieutenant-General Oliver Leese) took over the Eighth Army front line with the 7th Armoured Division (Major-General John Harding), 51st (Highland) Infantry Division (Major-General Douglas Wimberley) and the 2nd New Zealand Division (Major-General Sir Bernard Freyberg). At the end of November, Montgomery planned for the 2nd New Zealand Division with the 4th Light Armoured Brigade under command, to commence a wide outflanking movement on 13 December. A frontal attack by the 51st (Highland) Division on the coast and the 7th Armoured Division inland on their left would begin on the night of  once the New Zealanders were in position behind the Axis position.

Battle
Rommel's supply position had not improved: Tunisia was still being prioritised for supplies and of the ships which were sent to Tripoli to supply the Panzer Army in November, three-quarters had been destroyed. Rommel was short of men and equipment and very short of fuel and ammunition. His stated intention therefore was to hold out as long as possible but to retire in the face of strong pressure. When the preliminary attacks began on 11 December Rommel took this to be the start of Eighth Army's attack and started to withdraw. By mid morning on 12 December patrols detected that the Axis positions were starting to thin out. In response Montgomery ordered the New Zealand Division to move immediately and brought forward the main assault to the night of 14/15 December. By the evening of 12 December, the Axis withdrawal was under way, except for some units who were covering the extrication.

Rommel wished to launch his remaining armour at this outflanking force but was prevented by lack of fuel and ordered the withdrawal to continue. An attack by the 7th Armoured Division was repulsed in a rearguard action by the Italian Tactical Group Ariete. In his diary, Rommel wrote:

The Eighth Army change of plan had come too late and when the New Zealand Division completed their "left hook" on 15 December, they were dispersed after a difficult journey across difficult terrain which left them with only 17 serviceable tanks. They found the 15th Panzer Division on the escarpment guarding the coast road and the 6th New Zealand Brigade, further west, was ordered to form a block on the coast road, while the 5th Brigade protected the divisional supply and transport vehicles. During the night of 15/16 December, most of the remaining elements of the Panzer Army were able to withdraw towards Nofilia, moving in small fast columns through the gaps in the dispersed New Zealand units, under cover of dark. On 18 December, short-lived but fierce fighting took place at Nofaliya ( west of El Agheila), during which Rifleman Charles Ashford of the Kings Royal Rifles won the Military Medal for attacking an emplacement of panzers in his Bren Gun Carrier despite losing his support vehicles and being shot in the face. The fighting at Nofilia brought the battle of El Agheila to an end.

Aftermath

Analysis

Rommel later commented that experience should have told Montgomery that there was a good chance that

Casualties
In 1966, I. S. O. Playfair, the British official historian, gave an estimate of 450 Axis prisoners, 25 guns and 18 tanks destroyed from 13 to 17 December. In 1962, W. G. Stevens, the New Zealand official historian, recorded 2nd Zealand Division casualties of 11 killed, 29 wounded and 8 prisoners.

Subsequent operations
Rommel planned to defend the Gabes Gap in Tunisia, east of the pre-war French Mareth line, by holding the port of Buerat, while 5th Panzer Army of Generaloberst Hans-Jürgen von Arnim, already in Tunisia, confronted the Allied First Army. Bombing began on 12 January and XXX Corps attacked on 15 January, picking its way along the coast road, through minefields, demolitions and booby-traps. The New Zealand and 7th Armoured divisions swung inland via Tarhuna, supply being provided by the RASC and the New Zealand Army Service Corps, the operation being dependent on the quick capture of the port. Rommel withdrew on 15 January and by 19 January had retired from Tripoli, after destroying the port. The Axis troops then conducted delaying actions into Tunisia.

Notes

See also 

 List of British military equipment of World War II
 List of German military equipment of World War II
 List of Italian Army equipment in World War II

Footnotes

References

Further reading

External links

 Map, New Zealand Official History

Conflicts in 1942
1942 in Libya
Western Desert campaign
Libya in World War II
Battles of World War II involving the United Kingdom
Battles and operations of World War II involving Poland
Battles of World War II involving Italy
Battles of World War II involving New Zealand
Battles of World War II involving Germany
December 1942 events